Nottinghambukta is a bay in Wedel Jarlsberg Land at the western coast of Spitsbergen, Svalbard. It is located south of the coastal plain of Elveflya, and inside of Dunøyane.

References

Bays of Spitsbergen